Olha Zolotarova (born 27 December 1994) is a Ukrainian competitor in synchronized swimming.

She won 2 bronze medals at the 2013 World Aquatics Championships and a gold medal at the 2014 European Aquatics Championships.

References
FINA profile

1994 births
Living people
Ukrainian synchronized swimmers
Olympic synchronized swimmers of Ukraine
Synchronized swimmers at the 2016 Summer Olympics
World Aquatics Championships medalists in synchronised swimming
Synchronized swimmers at the 2013 World Aquatics Championships
Synchronized swimmers at the 2015 World Aquatics Championships
European Aquatics Championships medalists in synchronised swimming
Sportspeople from Kharkiv
21st-century Ukrainian women